William P. Worrall (November 13, 1827 – July 18, 1887) was an American politician from Pennsylvania who served as a Democratic member of the Pennsylvania House of Representatives for Delaware County from 1875 to 1876.

Early life
Worrall was born in Delaware County and worked as a railroad ticket agent and a farmer.  Worrall served in Company D of the 124th Pennsylvania Infantry Regiment, known as "Gideon's Band", from August 11, 1862 to May 15, 1863 during the American Civil War.

Career
He was elected to the Pennsylvania House of Representatives for Delaware County and served from 1875 to 1876.  He had unsuccessful campaigns for reelection in 1877 and 1888.

In 1878, Worrall was elected as delegate to the Democratic State Convention.  He was elected as supervisor for Delaware County from 1882 to 1883 and as justice of the peace for Ridley Township, Pennsylvania in 1883.

Personal life
In 1858, Worrall married Elizabeth C. Holland at the Third Presbyterian Church in Philadelphia, Pennsylvania.

Worrall died in Ridley Township and is interred at the Chester Rural Cemetery in Chester, Pennsylvania.

References

1827 births
1887 deaths
19th-century American politicians
American justices of the peace
Burials at Chester Rural Cemetery
Democratic Party members of the Pennsylvania House of Representatives
People from Ridley Township, Pennsylvania
People of Pennsylvania in the American Civil War
19th-century American judges